Maarten Vrolijk (14 May 1919 – 7 February 1994) was a Dutch politician of the Labour Party (PvdA).

Decorations

References

External links

Official
  Mr. M. (Maarten) Vrolijk Parlement & Politiek

 

1919 births
1994 deaths
Municipal councillors of The Hague
Dutch agnostics
Former Calvinist and Reformed Christians
Grand Officers of the Order of Orange-Nassau
King's and Queen's Commissioners of South Holland
Knights of the Order of the Netherlands Lion
Labour Party (Netherlands) politicians
Leiden University alumni
Members of the Council of State (Netherlands)
Members of the House of Representatives (Netherlands)
Ministers of Social Work of the Netherlands
Ministers of Sport of the Netherlands
Writers from The Hague
20th-century Dutch male writers
20th-century Dutch poets
20th-century Dutch politicians
20th-century Dutch journalists